The 1915–16 Divizia A was the seventh season of Divizia A, the top-level football league of Romania.

Final table

References

1915-16
1915–16 in European association football leagues
1915–16 in Romanian football